Audie Murphy (20 June 1925 – 28 May 1971) was one of the most decorated United States Army combat soldiers of World War II, serving from 1942 to 1945. He received every American combat award for valor available at the time of his service, including the Medal of Honor. He also received recognitions from France and Belgium. With his 1945 military discharge at the end of the war, Murphy became an advocate of treatment for post-traumatic stress disorder in veterans. The Audie L. Murphy Memorial VA Hospital in San Antonio and the Sergeant Audie Murphy Clubs (SAMC) on military bases honor his contributions. He joined the Texas National Guard in 1950, transferring to reserve status in 1956 and remaining in the Guard until 1969. He also had a civilian career as a film actor and songwriter. Recognitions he received both during his lifetime and posthumously are listed below.

Murphy participated in campaigns in North Africa, Sicily, Italy, France and Germany, as denoted by his European-African-Middle Eastern Campaign Medal with one silver battle star (denoting five campaigns), four bronze battle stars, plus a bronze arrowhead representing his two amphibious assault landings at Sicily and southern France. On 25 February 1945 and 3 March 1945, he received two Silver Stars for further heroic actions. The French government awarded Murphy its Chevalier of the Legion of Honor and two Croix de guerre medals. He received the Croix de guerre 1940 Palm from Belgium. The military assisted him with replacement medals after he gave away the originals. Duplicates of his Medal of Honor and other medals can be viewed at Dallas Scottish Rite Temple museum.

U.S. medals, awards, decorations and badges

U.S. military personal decorations

U.S. military unit awards

U.S. non-military personal decorations

U.S. military service and campaign medals

Badges

Non-U.S. military personal decorations, unit awards and service medals

U.S. State defense forces

Service ranks

Other honors

Sergeant Audie Murphy Club

In September 1986, the Command Sergeant Major George L. Horvath III, III Corps Commander Lieutenant General Crosbie E. Saint and several others established the Sergeant Audie Murphy Club at Fort Hood, Texas. The official club crest was designed by club co-founder Don Moore. Since 1994, other units of the U.S. Army have established chapters of the Sergeant Audie Murphy Club (SAMC) as exclusive clubs to honor noncommissioned officers (Corporal E-4 through Sergeant First Class E-7) who have acted in a manner consistent with the actions of Audie Murphy. In 2012 a bronze bust created by Mark and Jenelle Byrd for display in the Sgt. Audie Murphy Club Room in Snow Hall was unveiled at Fort Sill, Oklahoma .

U.S. government, military and veterans organizations
 1972 – Audie Murphy Gym dedicated at Fort Benning, Georgia. Its 2009 renovation included a name change to the Audie Murphy Athletic Performance Center.
 1973 – Audie L. Murphy Memorial VA Hospital,  San Antonio, Texas dedicated, featuring an outdoor  bronze statue created by Jimilu Mason, funded by the Audie L. Murphy Foundation.
 1985 –  bronze statue at Camp Mabry, sculpted by West Texas artist Bill Leftwich, sponsored by the Texas National Guard.
 30 May 1996 – Texas Congressman Ralph Hall commemorated the 25th anniversary of Murphy's death by reading "In Memory of Major Audie L. Murphy" and Murphy's poems, "Alone and Far Removed" and "Freedom Flies in Your Heart Like an Eagle" into the Congressional Record.
 3 May 2000 – Murphy was honored with his portrait on a thirty-three cent United States postage stamp.
 9 March 2001 – Camp Eagle military visitor lodging Audie Murphy Inn dedicated near Tuzla, Bosnia and Herzegovina by the 3rd Infantry Division.
 28 May 2006 – a  commemorative plaque unveiled at Mount Soledad Veterans Memorial in La Jolla, California.
 September 2008 – American Legion Audie Murphy Post 336 chartered, San Antonio, Texas.
 Date unknown – Audie Murphy Award sponsored by the American Veterans Center, honoring veterans of World War II.

Texas (non-military)
 1948 – Audie Murphy Arena, near Euless, Texas, was dedicated as a venue for the yearly Audie Murphy Rodeo. In 1952 the Rodeo moved to Stephenville, Texas, where it closed during the mid 1950s.
 12 February 1949 – Murphy made an honorary Texas A&M University cadet colonel.
 2 July 1949 – Murphy made an honorary Texas Ranger and chosen to lead the Texas Ranger Day parade in Brooks County.
 1951 – Artist Kipp Soldwedel commissioned to paint Murphy's portrait, now owned by the State of Texas and hung in various locations in the Texas State Capitol.
 1962 – Dallas artist Dmitri Vail commissioned to paint Murphy's portrait, believed to be owned by Murphy's family.
 1973 –  Texas State Historical Marker 7820 installed in Celeste, denoting Murphy's one-time residency.
 1973 – Texas State Historical Marker 7821 installed in Kingston, denoting Murphy's birthplace.
 1975 – Post Office, Greenville, Texas State Historical Marker 7799 denoted it as the site of Murphy's military enlistment; the building and it was added to the National Register of Historic Places listings in Hunt County, Texas, in 1974 .
 20 June 1996 – Texas Legislature officially declared his birthdate as "Audie Murphy Day".
 1999, Memorial Day – Pink granite obelisk at Texas State Cemetery dedicated listing the names of all Texas-born Medal of Honor recipients, including Murphy.
 22 June 2002 – Audie Murphy American Cotton Museum, Greenville,   hollow bronze statue of Murphy sculpted by Gordon Thomas.
 2008 – Texas State Historical Marker 15321, Farmersville, denotes Murphy's post-war homecoming.
 2010 – Audie Murphy Middle School established in Alamo.

Other U.S. states
 1971 – Audie Murphy Patriotism Award. When Murphy's death on 28 May 1971, aborted his scheduled appearance at that year's 4 July Spirit of America Festival in Decatur, Alabama, the festival created the annual award in his memory.
 11 November 1972 – Patriotic Hall. Los Angeles, California,  by  commemorative plaque listing medals won by Murphy during World War II.
 10 November 1974 – Mounted plaque erected at Brush Mountain, Virginia, by Veterans of Foreign Wars Post 5311 of Christiansburg, Virginia, to commemorate the site of Murphy's death.

Non-United States
 17 July 1948 – In Paris, Murphy made an honorary member in the 159th French Alpine Regiment.
 14 October 1991 – Sierra Leone issued a postage stamp, Le 2 value, honors Murphy in To Hell and Back (Scott No. 1409).
 18 October 1993 – Guyana issued a postage stamp of Murphy in uniform as part of a nine-stamp sheet in tribute to "World War II on the Silver Screen".
 20 July 1995 – Nevis Island issued an eight-stamp souvenir sheet with Murphy in the top row.
 29 January 2000 – Holtzwihr artist Patrick Baumann designed a commemorative plaque depicting Murphy on a tank destroyer, affixed to a wall at the site of the Medal of Honor action.
 2001 – Republic of Palau Murphy commemorative stamp part of a four-stamp sheet "Remembering VJ Day".
 9 June 2013 – Second free-standing commemorative plaque depicting Murphy firing the .50 caliber machine gun atop the tank unveiled at Holtzwihr by local authorities, the U.S. Consul General in Strasbourg, and representatives from American social organizations based in the Alsace region.

Entertainment industry
 Date unknown – Historical marker at Kanab, Utah's Walk of Fame denoting movies Murphy made in the state.
 1959 – Laurel Award nominee for Top Action Performance in Ride a Crooked Trail.
 9 February 1960 – Star on the Hollywood Walk of Fame.
 23 August 1985 – Golden Boot Award.
 16 March 1996 – Induction into the National Cowboy & Western Heritage Museum in Oklahoma City, Oklahoma.
 2001 – Audie Murphy Theatrical Award.
 11 November 2010 – Commemorative sidewalk plaque on the Santa Clarita Western Walk of Fame, Newhall, California.

Freemasonry
In November 2000, Murphy was posthumously awarded the Scottish Rite Masonry 33rd Degree in Long Beach, California, presented to his widow Pamela. From 1955 until his death, Murphy was a member of numerous Scottish Rite lodges in California and Texas. The Murat Shriners of Indianapolis, Indiana, provided the below timeline of Murphy's degrees and lodge associations.
 1955
14 February – Entered Apprentice degree, North Hollywood Lodge No. 542
4 April – Fellowcraft degree
27 June – Master Mason degree
 1956 – Second North Hollywood membership, Magnolia Park No. 618
 1957
 11–14 November – degree work and 32nd degree Scottish Rite Temple in Dallas
Thomas B. Hunter Memorial Class vice president
15 November – Hella Temple, Dallas shriner
 1965
14 November – Master of the Royal Secret, Valley of Dallas, Orient of Texas
 11–1 December, 965 Knight Commander of the Court of Honor KCCH
 1971
19 March – Al Malaikah Temple in Los Angeles
2 April – Long Beach Scottish Rite Bodies

Books

Notes

Footnotes

Citations

References

External links

 

United States Army Medal of Honor recipients
Recipients of the Croix de guerre (Belgium)
Recipients of the Croix de Guerre 1939–1945 (France)
Recipients of the Legion of Merit
Recipients of the Silver Star
Recipients of the Distinguished Service Cross (United States)
United States Army personnel of World War II
Audie Murphy